The Brasília National Park is a national park located in the northwest of the Federal District and in the center of the state of Goiás, in the Brazil. It is administered by the Chico Mendes Institute for Biodiversity Conservation (ICMBio). It is the largest park in an urbanized area in the world.

History
It is under IUCN Category II. It is directly related to the development of Brasilia. According to the Ministry of Agriculture, the park was protected to provide forested area around the national capital of Brazil. In 1994, seventy percent of the park burned.

Geography

The park is in the northwest of the Federal District in the center-west region of Brazil. Its boundaries have been fixed and also fenced. The park is divided into Intangible, Primitive, Extensive, Intensive, Special and Recuperation zones from the development perspective.

The terrain is an undulating plateau with geological formations of quartzites and limestones. It has many caves and several springs. Apart from the springs, the source of water supply to the park is also through a reservoir. The most prominent features of the park are the pools formed from water wells. Several creeks flow through the park, including the Bananal, Torto, and Santa Maria Creeks. Because of the large number of springs, its nickname is Agua Mineral (mineral water); the water is reported to have healing properties. There are many trekking trails through the park.

Climate
The climate of the region, according to the Köppen classification, is "tropical savanna". The rainy season begins in October and ends in April, representing 84% of the annual total. The wettest quarter is from November to January, and December is the month with the highest rainfall of the year. The dry season is from May to September, and in the driest quarter is June, July, and August, when precipitation represents only 2% of the annual total. Eastern winds are dominant in the park.

Flora

Cerrado or upland savanna trees, the dominant vegetation in the central regions of Brazil, form the core area of this park. However, the vegetation around the springs and streams are of Campo Cerrado type, which consists of gallery forests. These areas fall under the biosphere reserve declared by UNESCO. The plant species reported from the park are buriti palm and many species of the Velloziaceae (a family of monocotyledonous flowering plants. The park has established a forest tree nursery and also runs a centre for environmental education.

Fauna
The faunal species reported from the park are: maned wolf (Chrysocyon brachyurus), pampas deer (Ozotoceros bezoarticus), giant anteater (Myrmecophaga tridactyla), bush dog (Speothos venaticus), giant otter (Pteronura brasiliensis), giant armadillo (Priodontes giganteus), black howler monkey (Alouatta caraya), forest rabbit (Sylvilagus brasiliensis), Juscelinomys candangus, cavy (Galea spixii), Calhartes burrovianus urubutinga, Mussurana (Portuguese muçurana) and tegu (Tupinambis teguixin). Also reported are black-tufted marmoset (Callithrix penicillata), capybara, jaguar, wild pig and puma.

Birds include greater rhea (Rhea americana), red-legged seriema (Cariama cristata), osprey (Pandion haliaetus), king vulture (Sarcoramphus papa), solitary eagle (Buteogallus coronatus), seed finches, Oryzoborus crassirostris, O. angloensis, spotted tinamou (Nothura maculosa), lesser yellow-headed vulture (Cathartes burrovianus), curl-crested jay  (Cyanocorax cristatellus), fer-de-lance (Bothrops jararaca), burrowing owl (Athene cunicularia), and toco toucan (Ramphastos toco).

References

National parks of Brazil
Protected areas of Federal District (Brazil)
Cerrado